In the China, amateur radio licensing is governed by the State Radio Regulation of China (SRRC).

The CRAC Amateur Radio Operation License is issued by the China Radio Association Amateur Radio Working Committee (CRAC).

Current license classes 

 A Class - The entry-level license, known as "Class A" in Chinese, is awarded after an applicant successfully completes a 30-question multiple choice written examination. VHF and UHF, Transmit power ≤ 25 W. (no HF bands)
 B Class -  The next-level license, known as "Class B" in Chinese,  requires passage of the A Class test, as well as a 50-question multiple-choice written examination. The license grants full operating privileges on all amateur bands, HF bands ≤ 100 W, above HF bands ≤ 25 W.
 C Class -  The top-level license, known as "Class C" in Chinese, requires 80-question multiple-choice theory exam. The license grants full operating privileges on all amateur bands, Transmit power ≤ 1000 W for HF bands, above HF bands ≤ 25 W.

Previous license classes 

 First Class - The top-level license, converted into Class C in the license conversion process,
 Second Class - Converted into Class B in the license upgrade process,
 Third Class - Converted into Class B in the license upgrade process,
 Fourth Class - The entry-level license, converted into Class A in the license conversion process.

Those licenses are now under a conversion process to the new classification model.

History of China amateur licensing

Formation and early history

Restructuring in 2017

End of Morse code requirement

Call signs 
Table of allocation of international call sign series
 BAA-BZZ | China (People's Republic of)

See also 
Chinese Radio Amateurs Club

References

 AC6V's History of Amateur Radio

External links

China
 by country
China